Happy Medium is the follow-up album to Preposterously Dank by rapper Spose.

Track listing 
 The Audacity! (Intro) 
 Happy Medium (ft. Stiky-1) 
 The Cask 
 Can't Get There From Here
 Pop Song
 All I Do Is Rhyme (ft. Cam Groves) 
 Christmas Song
 (Peter Sparker) In This B****
 I'm Awesome Remix (ft. Mac Lethal) 
 Sketchball
 Hush (CD version only)
 Into Spose (ft. Space vs Speed) (Includes hidden track "Watchin' Some TV")

2011 albums
Hip hop albums by American artists